Austin Lucas is an American indie artist best known for his own blend of folk punk.

Early years
Lucas grew up in Bloomington, Indiana, but moved to the Czech Republic in 2003. In 2008, he relocated back to the United States. He is the son of Bob Lucas, who is a producer/songwriter best known for his work with Alison Krauss. Lucas spent six years as a member of the Indiana University Children's Choir.

Career
Lucas was bassist and backing vocalist in the band Twenty Third Chapter from 1997 to 1999 and lead vocalist in Rune from 1998 to 2000. He was also involved with the band K10 Prospect as lead singer/guitarist from 2000 to 2004. He then played lead guitar in the Prague-based band Guided Cradle, starting in 2004.
He has also worked with fellow indie artist Chuck Ragan. The two first collaborated in 2007 when they released a split album, and later on the Bristle Ridge record in 2008. Lucas took part in he Revival Tour alongside Ragan, Ben Nichols of Lucero, and Tim Barry. The following year, he rejoined the Revival Tour alongside his father, Ragan, Barry, Frank Turner, Jim Ward, and other artists.

In 2013, Lucas was signed to New West Records and released a new studio album, Stay Reckless.

On August 17, 2018, he released the album Immortal Americans on Cornelius Chapel Records.

Lucas, who is anti-fascist, Jewish, and openly pansexual, has spoken about how the American country music genre is "a very cis, hetero club overall", and how he used to worry that his identity and politics might negatively affect his career.

Discography
 The Common Cold (2006)
 Split 7" with Chuck Ragan (2007)
 Putting the Hammer Down (2007)
 Bristle Ridge with Chuck Ragan (2008)
 At War with Freak Folk (2008)
 Somebody Loves You (2009)
 Two Songs EP (2010)
 Collection (2010)
 A New Home in the Old World (2011)
 Stay Reckless (2013)
 Between the Moon & the Midwest (2016)
 Immortal Americans (2018)
 No One Is Immortal (2019)
 Alive in the Hot Zone (2020)

References

External links
 

Year of birth missing (living people)
Living people
American folk singers
American punk rock musicians
American country musicians
American folk musicians
American singer-songwriters
People from Indiana
American male singer-songwriters
Pansexual musicians